Melchior Ndadaye International Airport  is an airport in Bujumbura, the former capital of Burundi. It is Burundi's only international airport and the only one with a paved runway.

History
The airport was opened in 1952. On 1 July 2019, the airport was renamed Melchior Ndadaye International Airport after the first democratically elected president of Burundi who was murdered in a coup d'état in October 1993, three months after being elected. This event sparked the decade-long Burundian Civil War.

Airlines and destinations
, the following airlines maintain regular scheduled service to Bujumbura International Airport:

Passenger

Cargo

See also

 Air Burundi

References

External links

Airports in Burundi
Buildings and structures in Bujumbura
Airports established in 1952
1952 establishments in Burundi